Dürrröhrsdorf-Dittersbach is a municipality in the district of Sächsische Schweiz-Osterzgebirge, Saxony, Germany. It is located on the river Wesenitz, 6 km west of Stolpen, 9 km northeast of Pirna and 18 km east of Dresden.

Subdivisions
Dittersbach
Dobra
Dürrröhrsdorf
Elbersdorf
Porschendorf
Stürza
Wilschdorf
Wünschendorf

Main sights
The Belvedere on the Schöne Höhe hill, a tower decorated with frescoes by painter Carl Gottlieb Peschel after works of Johann Wolfgang Goethe. Founded by Johann Gottlob von Quandt (1787–1859), it includes a local history exhibition.
Dittersbacher Jahrmarkt

References

External links
 Schöne Höhe 
 Quandt-Verein 
 SV-Wesenitztal e.V.